Varsenik Manucharyan (born 11 July 2003) is an Armenian swimmer. In 2021, she competed in the women's 100 metre freestyle event at the 2020 Summer Olympics held in Tokyo, Japan.

Career 
In 2019, she represented Armenia at the 2019 World Aquatics Championships held in Gwangju, South Korea. She competed in the women's 50 metre freestyle event. She did not advance to compete in the semi-finals. She also competed in the women's 50 metre butterfly event and two mixed relay events: 4 × 100 metre mixed freestyle relay and 4 × 100 metre mixed medley relay.

References

External links
 

Living people
2003 births
Armenian female freestyle swimmers
Swimmers at the 2020 Summer Olympics
Olympic swimmers of Armenia
Female butterfly swimmers
21st-century Armenian women